Amaia González de Garibay (born 27 February 1994) is a Spanish handball player for Prosetecnisa BM Zuazo and the Spanish national team.

Detailed trajectory in Spanish Wikipedia

References

1994 births
Living people
Sportspeople from Valladolid
Spanish female handball players
Competitors at the 2018 Mediterranean Games
Mediterranean Games gold medalists for Spain
Mediterranean Games medalists in handball
20th-century Spanish women
21st-century Spanish women